KYS or Kys may refer to:
 Kys (Caria), a town of ancient Caria
 Kolej Yayasan Saad, a school in Malaysia
 Kuopio University Hospital
 Kys, a novel by Tatyana Tolstaya
Krantikari Yuva Sangathan, a student organization in New Delhi, India